Tenterhooks Crevasses is a large system of crevasses in the Rennick Glacier between the Morozumi and Lanterman Ranges. The southern part of these crevasses (near Onlooker Nunatak) was traversed with great difficulty by members of the Northern Party of the New Zealand Geological Survey Antarctic Expedition (NZGSAE), 1963–64, who gave the name.

Crevasse fields of the Ross Dependency
Landforms of Victoria Land
Pennell Coast